Myrceugenia brevipedicellata is a species of plant in the family Myrtaceae. It is endemic to Brazil.

References

brevipedicellata
Endemic flora of Brazil
Vulnerable plants
Taxonomy articles created by Polbot
Taxa named by Max Burret